The Northern District (Mekhoz HaTzafon; , Minṭaqat ash-Shamāl) is one of Israel's six administrative districts. The Northern District has a land area of 4,478 km2, which increases to 4,638 km2 when both land and water are included. The district capital is Nof HaGalil and the largest city is Nazareth.

The Golan Heights has been run as a sub-district of the North District of Israel since the 1981 Golan Heights Law was passed, although the claim is only recognized by the United States while United Nations Security Council Resolution 497 condemns the annexation but does not enforce it. The Golan Heights covers a land area of 1,154 km2 and the remainder of the Northern District covers 3,324 km2 (3,484 km2 including water).

Demographics
According to the Israeli Central Bureau of Statistics data for 2021:
 Total population: 1,501,900 (2021)
 Ethnic:
 Arabs: 806,000 (53.7%)
 Jews: 637,400 (42.4%)
 Others: 58,500 (3.9%)

In the Israeli census, no distinction is made between Arab citizens of Israel and Syrian inhabitants of the Golan Heights, many of whom are not citizens of Israel, but of Syria.

 Religious:
 Jews: 637,400 (42.4%)
 Muslims: 588,500 (39.2%)
 Druze: 119,000 (7.9%)
 Arab Christians: 97,200 (6.5%)
 Not classified: 51,000 (3.4%)
 Density: 335/km2

The Northern District is the only district of Israel where the majority of inhabitants are Arabs.

Administrative local authorities

See also
 Galilee
 Arab localities in Israel
 List of cities in Israel

References